Dihydroxydisulfane or hypodithionous acid is a reduced sulfur oxyacid with sulfur in a formal oxidation state of +1. The structural formula is HOSSOH, with all atoms arranged in a chain. It is an isomer of thiosulfurous acid but is lower in energy. Other isomers include HOS(=O)SH, HOS(=S)OH, and HS(=O)2SH. Disulfur monoxide, S2O, can be considered as the anhydride. Unlike many of these other reduced sulfur acids, dihydroxydisulfane can be formed in a pure state by reacting hydrogen sulfide with sulfur dioxide at −70 °C in dichlorodifluoromethane.

H2S + SO2 → H2S2O2

Dihyroxydisulfane may exist in an equilibrium with thiosulfurous acid.

Organic derivatives such as dimethoxydisulfane, diaceto disulfide, and bis(trifluoroaceto) disulfide also exist.

The conjugate bases are called disulfanediolate(1−)  and disulfanediolate(2−) .

Properties
Calculations predict that the S−S bond length is 2.013 Å, O−S bond length is 1.645 Å, H−O bond length is 0.943 Å.

Related compounds
Related compounds include the isoelectronic substances hydrogen tetroxide HOOOOH, hydroxotrisulfane HOSSSH, HSOSSH, and tetrasulfane HSSSSH.

References

Sulfur oxoacids